The Yongli Emperor (1623–1662; reigned 24 December 1646 – 1 June 1662), personal name Zhu Youlang, was the fourth and last emperor of the Southern Ming, reigning in turbulent times when the former Ming dynasty was overthrown and the Manchu-led Qing dynasty progressively conquered the entire China proper. He led the remnants of the Ming loyalists with the assistance of peasant armies to resist the Qing forces in southwestern China, but he was then forced to exile to Toungoo Burma and eventually captured and executed by Wu Sangui in 1662. His era title "Yongli" means "perpetual calendar".

Zhu Youlang was the son of Zhu Changying (朱常瀛), the seventh son of the Wanli Emperor, and Empress Dowager Ma. He inherited the title Prince of Gui (桂王) from his brother and lived an obscure life as a minor member of the Ming imperial family until the rebellions of peasant armies, which resulted to the fall of the imperial capital, Beijing, and the suicide of the last Ming emperor, Chongzhen, after the peasant rebel leader Li Zicheng captured Beijing in 1644. The true beneficiaries of the collapse of the Ming were the Qing dynasty, ruled by the emerging nation Manchus from Manchuria. After mass defection from Ming remnants, including a former Ming general, Wu Sangui, who allowed the Qing forces to pass the Ming Great Wall against Li Zicheng. The Qing forces defeated the peasant armies and rapidly expanded to northern China, the Lower Yangtze valley, and Central China. The Ming loyalists continued to resist in southern China, with several former Ming royal members regrouping in the south in attempt to re-establish the Ming governance, but all failed before the rapid Manchu military advance. Youlang ascended the throne in Zhaoqing as the fourth Southern Ming emperor in November 1646. 

By 1661, pressed back into Yunnan province, he fled to Burma. A Qing Han Banner army led by Wu Sangui pursued and captured him from the king of Burma, and he was executed in June 1662.

History

Historical background
In April 1644 the last Ming emperor Zhu Youjian committed suicide in Coal Hill as a rebel army entered Beijing. Six weeks later, on 5 June, the army of the Manchus, a people from beyond the Great Wall, entered the city and proclaimed the end of the Ming and the beginning of the Qing. In the following two years, as the Qing extended their control over northern China, the remaining Ming loyalists  attempted to regroup in the south, but in rapid succession the Hongguang, Longwu, and Shaowu emperors were captured and executed.

Campaigns in southern China
Zhu Youlang became "Caretaker of the State" on 20 November 1646, following the death of the Longwu emperor. When Longwu's brother then declared himself emperor with the reign-title Shaowu, Youlang himself ascended the throne (24 December 1646) as Yongli emperor. A brief civil war between the two emperors ended a month later when the Qing captured and executed Shaowu.

Zhu Youlang succeeded to the throne with approval by his fathers widow and principal wife Empress Dowager Wang, who was his own adoptive mother, and during his first five years of reign, she acted as his adviser, and it was said that she was "...versed in letters, aware of current events, analytical about tasks and clear in her reasoning. After the Emperor assumed the throne there was nothing in which he did not follow her wishes."

The continuing military pressure of the Qing forced Youlang to withdraw further into the south and west, first to Guilin in Guangxi, then to Jiangxi and Hunan, then south again to Nanning in Guangxi. He had a number of experienced and devoted followers, but became increasingly reliant on the military support of local warlords and bandit chieftains. The best and most effective of these was Li Dingguo, who for five years was highly successful in enlarging Southern Ming territories in the southwest. This success, however, caused the Qing to place the entire region in the hands of the extremely capable former Ming official Hong Chengchou, who was named governor-general of five provinces. By 1658 Youlang had been forced back into Yunnan, on the very edge of China's southwestern frontier.

Flight and exile in Burma

In 1658 Zhu Youlang retreated to Kunming in Yunnan, from where he sought refuge under the protection of Pindale Min (1608–1661), ninth king of the Taungoo dynasty of Burma. Pindale gave him permission to live at Sagaing, near the Burmese capital of Ava (both near the modern Burmese city of Mandalay), provided his men surrendered their weapons. He finally fled into Burma in 1661.

It soon became apparent to the Burmese that Zhu Youlang intended to carve himself a kingdom in Burma, and war broke out between the exiled prince and his hosts. The Chinese devastated the land around Ava but failed to capture it, thanks to the defence offered by Pindale's mercenary Portuguese artillery (led by a mysterious Mi-thari Kattan, which might be a Burmese attempt at an otherwise unknown "Mister Cotton"). Pindale's attempt to profiteer from the resulting famine led to his overthrow by his brother and chief general, Pye Min (meaning "Prince Pye"), in May 1661. Pye broke the siege and demanded that all the Chinese, with the exception of Youlang himself, swear allegiance to the king of Ava, after which they would be dispersed through the kingdom. The ceremony at which this was to be carried out turned into a disaster, with the Chinese, fearing that the plan was to murder them all, turning on the Burmese. Pye now ordered all the Chinese, again with the exception of Youlang, to be put to death.

At this point, in December 1661, a Qing army of 20,000 under Wu Sangui entered Burma and demanded the surrender of Youlang. Pye summoned his advisors, who pointed out that both the Burmese and the Chinese had previously delivered up persons to each other. In addition, Wu Sangui's army was large, and the Burmese had already suffered enough from the presence of their guest. Accordingly, on 22 January 1662, the last monarch of the Southern Ming, together with his sons and grandsons, were put on boats and forwarded to Wu Sangui's camp near Ava. Thinking that he was being taken to his longtime military protector Li Dingguo, the forlorn emperor only realized his real destination when he arrived at Wu's camp.

Death
Zhu Youlang, Prince of Gui and last serious claimant to the Ming throne, was delivered into the custody of Wu Sangui, a Chinese general who had once served the Ming, and Manchu prince, general, and high minister of state, Aixinga. He was transported to Yunnanfu, the capital of Yunnan, where in June he was personally strangled by Wu Sangui. Wu had played a major role in the overthrow of the dynasty, having opened the gates in the Great Wall to the Qing and later leading the Qing campaign against the Southern Ming. It is said that Youlang scorned Wu in his last moments, saying that he betrayed his people and country, and urged Wu to kill him faster because he was disgusted to see "a traitor's face."

The last Ming dynasty princes who held out against the Qing after Zhu Youlang were Zhu Shugui, Prince of Ningjing and Zhu Hónghuán, Prince of Lu who accompanied Koxinga to Taiwan. Zhu Shugui acted as his representative in the Kingdom of Tungning and performed rites in his name until 1683.

Family
Consort and Issue:
Empress Xiaogangkuang, of the Wang clan (孝刚匡皇后 王氏;d.1662)
Zhu Cixuan, Crown Prince Aimin (哀愍太子 朱慈煊; 23 April 1648 – 1 June 1662), third son
Zhu Ci?, Prince Ai of Yuan (沅哀王 朱慈𤇥; b. 1650), fourth son
Zhu Ciyi, Prince Shang of Mian (沔殤王 朱慈熠; 1654–1655), sixth son
Consort,  of the Dou clan (妃 竇氏)
Consort, of the Mou clan (妃 某氏)
Noble Lady, of the Dai clan (貴人 戴氏)
Zhu Ciwei, Prince Dao of Fu (涪悼王 朱慈煒; 1654–1655, fifth son
Concubine, of the Mou clan (宮嬪 某氏)
Noble Lady, of the Yang clan (貴人 楊氏; d. 1661)
Zhu Cizhuo, Prince Chong of Li (澧沖王 朱慈焯; 1654–1656), seventh son
Noble Lady, of the Liu clan (貴人 劉氏)
Noble Lady, of the Yang clan (貴人 楊氏)
First-Class Female Attendant, of the Guo clan (常在 郭氏), personal name Liangpu (良璞)
Unknown
Zhu Cijue, Crown Prince Huaimin (懷愍太子 朱慈爝; b. 1645), first son
Zhu Ci?, Crown Prince Daomin (悼愍太子 朱慈𤇅; b. 1646), second son

Ancestry

Notes

References

Citations

Sources 
 
 
 .
 
 
 
 

1623 births
1662 deaths
17th-century Chinese monarchs
17th-century executions by China
Executed Ming dynasty people
Executed people from Beijing
People executed by the Qing dynasty
People executed by strangulation
Southern Ming emperors
Executed monarchs